Mitchell Ryan (January 11, 1934 – March 4, 2022) was an American film, television, and stage actor, who in his six decades of television is known for playing Burke Devlin in the 1960s gothic soap opera Dark Shadows, and later for his co-starring role as Thomas Gibson's father Edward Montgomery on Dharma & Greg. He also played the villainous General Peter McAllister in the 1987 buddy cop action film Lethal Weapon.

Early life 
Ryan was born in Cincinnati, Ohio, and raised in Louisville, Kentucky. His father was a salesman and his mother was a writer. He served in the United States Navy during the Korean War.

Career 
A life member of the Actors Studio, Ryan's Broadway theatre credits include Wait Until Dark, Medea, and The Price. His off-Broadway credits include Antony and Cleopatra (1963) and The Price (1979).

Ryan was an original cast member on the cult TV soap opera Dark Shadows, playing Burke Devlin until he was fired from the show in June 1967 due to his alcoholism, and replaced by Anthony George.

In 1970, Ryan was in one episode of The High Chaparral as a character named Jelks, who was on the run from the law.

He appeared in an episode of Cannon, "Fool's Gold" in 1971, and in ABC's The Streets of San Francisco episode "The Unicorn". He portrayed the title character, Chase Reddick, on the crime drama Chase (1973–74). 

In 1975, Ryan played in Barnaby Jones, in the episode titled "Counterfall". He portrayed the leading character, Dan Walling, on Executive Suite (1976–77) and played Blake Simmons in the drama Julie Farr, M.D. (1978–79). 

Ryan portrayed Cooper Hawkins on the Western series The Chisholms (1980), Sam Garrett on King's Crossing (1982) Brennan Flannery on High Performance (1983), Edward Wyler on Hot Pursuit (1984), and Porter Tremont on 2000 Malibu Road (1992).  

His other acting credits include the films Liar Liar; Magnum Force playing as Dirty Harry's ill-fated despondent best friend and fellow police officer, a motorcycle patrolman named Charlie McCoy; Lethal Weapon playing the key villain General Peter McAllister; Grosse Pointe Blank; Electra Glide in Blue;  and Hot Shots! Part Deux, playing senator Grey Edwards. In 1985, he portrayed Tillet Main, the patriarch of the Main family in the first North and South miniseries. In 1991, he played Ellis Blake in the sixth season Matlock episode "The Foursome".

Ryan appeared in NBC's The A-Team; he played Ike Hagan, as Grant Everett in a two-part Silk Stalkings episode; and as Kyle Riker, the father of Commander William Riker, in the Star Trek: The Next Generation episode "The Icarus Factor"; Ryan had been considered for the part of series lead Captain Jean-Luc Picard. He also portrayed the roles of the abusive boyfriend of Blanche Devereaux, Rex Huntington, in The Golden Girls episode "The Bloom is off the Rose", and a police officer in a 1993 episode of NYPD Blue. The same year, Ryan was Dallas Shields in Renegade. He appeared in the 1983 episode of Hart to Hart 'Highland Fling'. In 1994, he appeared again in Hart to Hart in one of the made-for-TV movies, "Home Is Where the Hart Is". In 1995, he appeared in the films Judge Dredd and Halloween: The Curse of Michael Myers as Dr. Terence Wynn (played by Robert Phalen in the original Halloween film).

He played the role of Greg's father, Edward Montgomery, on the comedy Dharma & Greg (1997–2002). The following year, Ryan voiced Highfather on Justice League.

He was the president of Screen Actors Guild Foundation.

Personal life
Ryan married Lynda Morse in 1972. They later divorced. The couple had one child. In 1998 Ryan married Barbara Albertine, after 11 years of being together. They have two children and five grandchildren. Ryan died of heart failure at his home in Los Angeles, California on March 4, 2022, at the age of 88.

Filmography

 1958 Thunder Road as Jed Moultrie (uncredited)
 1966–1967 Dark Shadows (TV Series) as Burke Devlin
 1970 Monte Walsh as "Shorty" Austin
 1971 My Old Man's Place as Sergeant Martin Flood 
 1971 The Hunting Party as "Doc" Harrison
 1971 Chandler as Chuck Kincaid
 1972 The Honkers as Lowell
 1972 A Reflection of Fear as Inspector McKenna
 1973 High Plains Drifter as Dave Drake
 1973 The Friends of Eddie Coyle as Waters
 1973 Electra Glide in Blue as Detective Harvey Poole
 1973 Magnum Force as Officer Charlie McCoy
 1976 Midway as Rear Admiral Aubrey W. Fitch (uncredited)
 1976 Two-Minute Warning as The Priest
 1977 Christmas Miracle in Caufield, U.S.A. as Matthew Sullivan
 1981 Death of a Centerfold: The Dorothy Stratten Story as Hugh Hefner
 1983 Hart to Hart ("Highland Fling") as Ramsey T. MacLaish
 1985 The A-Team as Ike Hagen
 1985 North and South (TV miniseries) as Tillet Main
 1986 Penalty Phase as Judge Donald Faulkner 
 1987 Lethal Weapon as General Peter McCallister
 1989 Mission Impossible (1988 TV Series S1:E18 - Submarine) as Admiral Edgar Sheppard
 1989 Star Trek: The Next Generation (S2:E14 - The Icarus Factor) as Kyle Riker, father of Commander Will Riker 
 1989 Winter People as Drury Campbell
 1989 Santa Barbara as Anthony Tonnell
 1990 L.A. Law (S5:E5 – Smoke Gets In Your Thighs) as Duncan Young
 1991 The Golden Girls (S6:E13 – The Bloom Is Off the Rose) as Rex
 1991 Murder, She Wrote (The List of Uri Lermintov) as Rep. Arthur Prouty 
 1991 In a Child's Name as Peter Chappell
 1992 Aces: Iron Eagle III as General Simms 
 1993 The Opposite Sex and How to Live with Them as Kenneth Davenport
 1993 Hot Shots! Part Deux as Gray Edwards
 1994 Walker, Texas Ranger (S2:E17 - The Committee) as Judge Riley
 1994 Blue Sky as Ray Stevens
 1994 Speechless as Lloyd Wannamaker 
 1995 Judge Dredd as Vartis Hammond
 1995 Halloween: The Curse of Michael Myers as Dr. Terrence Wynn
 1996 Ed as Abe Woods
 1997 The Devil's Own as Chief Jim Kelly
 1997 Liar Liar as Mr. Allan
 1997 Grosse Pointe Blank as Mr. Bart Newberry
 1999 Making Contact as Hunter
 2005 Love for Rent as Doctor (uncredited) 
 2009 Stakeout as Man In Car (TV Short)
 2021 Smartphone Theatre as Harry (TV Series) 1 episode 
 TBA  Valley of Shadows'' as Kenton MacBride (pre-production)

References

External links

 
 
 
 

1928 births
2022 deaths
20th-century American male actors
21st-century American male actors
American male film actors
American male stage actors
American male television actors
Burials at Woodlawn Memorial Cemetery, Santa Monica
Male actors from Cincinnati
Male actors from Louisville, Kentucky
Male Western (genre) film actors
Military personnel from Cincinnati
Military personnel from Louisville, Kentucky
United States Navy personnel of the Korean War
Western (genre) television actors